Jeffrey Marc Zgonina (born May 24, 1970) is an American football defensive line coach for the Washington Commanders and former defensive tackle who played seventeen seasons in the National Football League (NFL). He played college football at Purdue and was drafted by the Pittsburgh Steelers in the seventh round of the 1993 NFL Draft.

Zgonina was a member of the 1999 St. Louis Rams that won Super Bowl XXXIV and also played for the Carolina Panthers, Atlanta Falcons, Indianapolis Colts, Miami Dolphins, and Houston Texans. As a coach, he has been a member of the Houston Texans, New York Giants, and San Francisco 49ers.

High school
Zgonina attended Carmel High School in Mundelein and was a letterman in football, basketball, hockey, and track and field. In football, he won All-East Suburban Catholic Conference honors, All-Area honors, All-County honors, and All-State honors.

College career
Zgonina attended Purdue University from 1989 to 1992, starting his entire career. He twice led the Boilermakers in sacks and tackles for loss, he led the team in total tackles one season. He had a fumble return of 67 yards, a record for Purdue defensive linemen. He currently holds Purdue records for 'tackles for loss' for a single game (7.0), a season (28.0) and a career (72.0). He is currently #6 in total tackles (382) and solo tackles (266); and #3 in sacks (29.0). His senior season was outstanding as he had 28 tackles for loss and 13 sacks; was selected as a 1st Team All-Big Ten and the Big Ten Defensive Player of the Year. Following his senior year, he participated in the 1993 East-West Shrine Game, Hula Bowl, and Japan Bowl.

Professional career
Zgonina played 17 seasons in the NFL and spent more time with the St. Louis Rams than with any other team, which included a Super Bowl title in the 2000 season (XXXIV). His best season, however, came with the Miami Dolphins in 2004, when he recorded 63 tackles and five sacks.

He was drafted by the Pittsburgh Steelers in the seventh round of the 1993 NFL Draft. He spent two seasons with the Steelers, recording 27 tackles in 21 game appearances before being waived after the 1994 season. He was claimed off waivers by the Carolina Panthers on August 29, 1995, and he recorded two tackles in two game appearance for the Panthers in 1995. He signed with the Atlanta Falcons in 1996, and made one sack, one fumble recovery, and 12 tackles in the eight games he played. Zgonina signed a two-year contract with the St. Louis Rams on March 12, 1997. He played in 15 games in 1997, producing two sacks and 21 tackles. He was released by the Rams on August 21, 1998. Zgonina was signed by the Oakland Raiders on October 14, 1998, but was released six days later. before playing in a game for the Raiders. He signed with the Indianapolis Colts later in the season and played in two games.

Zgonina re-signed with the Rams on March 27, 1999. He spent four seasons with the Rams, becoming their starting defensive tackle during the 2000 season. He earned a Super Bowl ring in 2000 after St. Louis beat the Tennessee Titans in Super Bowl XXXIV. He was also a member of the 2001 NFC Champion Rams, starting 13 games and playing in Super Bowl XXXVI. He recorded 144 tackles, 10.5 sacks, three forced fumbles, and six fumble recoveries in his second tenure with the Rams.

Zgonina signed a four-year contract with the Miami Dolphins on April 1, 2003. In his four-year career with the Dolphins, he made 178 tackles, 10 sacks, an interception, and two fumble recoveries in 62 games (22 starts). He signed with the Houston Texans on March 14, 2007, He had 64 tackles, 2.5 sacks, and two fumble recoveries in his three-year tenure, including playing in all 48 games with five starts.

Coaching career
In 2013, Houston Texans hired Zgonina to become an assistant defensive line coach. As an assistant coach for the Texans, he worked closely with defensive line coach/assistant head coach Bill Kollar who was his coach at Purdue University in 1989. In 2016, he became the assistant defensive line coach of the New York Giants. Zgonina was the defensive line coach of the San Francisco 49ers from 2017 to 2019. In 2020, he was hired as the assistant defensive line coach for the Washington Football Team and was promoted to lead defensive line coach following the firing of Sam Mills III in 2022.

Personal life
Zgonina is of Polish descent. He has performed in dog shows since 2014.

References

External links
Washington Commanders bio

1970 births
Living people
Sportspeople from Chicago
Players of American football from Chicago
American football defensive tackles
American people of Polish descent
Purdue Boilermakers football players
Pittsburgh Steelers players
Carolina Panthers players
Atlanta Falcons players
St. Louis Rams players
Indianapolis Colts players
Miami Dolphins players
Houston Texans players
Houston Texans coaches
New York Giants coaches
San Francisco 49ers coaches
Washington Commanders coaches
Washington Football Team coaches